Benjamin Bratt (born December 16, 1963) is an American actor and producer who has worked in film and on television. He had supporting film roles in the 1990s in Demolition Man (1993), Clear and Present Danger (1994), and The River Wild (1994). From 1995 to 1999, he starred as New York City Police Department (NYPD) Detective Rey Curtis on the NBC drama series Law & Order.

In the 2000s, Bratt appeared in Miss Congeniality (2000), Traffic (2000), Piñero (2001), Catwoman (2004), and Trucker (2008), Despicable Me 2 (2013), Snitch (2013), Coco (2017), among other films. On television, Bratt has portrayed Dr. Jake Reilly on ABC's Private Practice (2011–2013), Steve Navarro on 24: Live Another Day (2014), and Jahil Rivera on Star (2016–2018). He has also done voice acting in animated feature films. 

Bratt produced the film Dolores (2017), which explores the life of Dolores Huerta, an American labor leader and civil rights activist. The film received critical acclaim and several awards.

Bratt has received a Screen Actors Guild Award and been nominated for two others. He has received four ALMA Awards, a Primetime Emmy Award nomination, and a Blockbuster Entertainment Award. He is an activist in the American Indian Movement.

Early life
Bratt was born on December 16, 1963, in San Francisco, California, the third of five children of Eldy (née Banda), a nurse and political activist, and Peter Bratt Sr., a sheet metal worker. His mother was born in Lima, Peru, and is of Quechua descent. She moved to the United States with her family at age 14. His father is an American of German and English ancestry. Bratt's paternal grandfather, George, was a Broadway actor.

An activist for Native American rights, his mother took Bratt (age 6) and her other children to participate in the 1969 Native American occupation of Alcatraz. Led by young people from San Francisco, it raised national awareness of issues facing Native Americans, and attracted participants from across the country. Bratt attended Lowell High School in San Francisco, where he was a member of the Lowell Forensic Society. Bratt earned a B.F.A. at the University of California, Santa Barbara in 1986, where he joined the Lambda Chi Alpha fraternity. Enrolled in the M.F.A. program at the American Conservatory Theater in San Francisco, he left before receiving his degree in order to star in the 1987 television film Juarez.

Career

Early work 
He started his professional acting career at the Utah Shakespearean Festival, where he starred in the television film Juarez (1987). This received much critical acclaim, and he landed a supporting role in the television film Police Story: Gladiator School (1988). Also, he played his first film role as Esteban in Lovers, Partners & Spies (1988), which did not perform well at the box office. Bratt worked extensively in television, with roles in the Knightwatch and Nasty Boys series. In 1989, he starred in the film Nasty Boys, based on the television series.

Hollywood breakthrough and success 
After several low-budget films and television films, including One Good Cop and Shadowhunter, in 1993, Bratt appeared in two Hollywood films. He portrayed a gang member turned LAPD officer named Paco Aguilar in Blood In, Blood Out, and Officer Alfredo Garcia from the year 2032 in Demolition Man. 

The following year, he played supporting roles in the popular films of The River Wild, Clear and Present Danger, and James A. Michener's Texas. 

Returning to television, he played Detective Reynaldo Curtis in the popular series Law & Order replacing Chris Noth, which gained him international recognition. Bratt appeared in 95 episodes over 5 seasons, 14 years, and 2 stints on the NBC show. For his role, in 1999 he was nominated for the Primetime Emmy Award for Outstanding Supporting Actor in a Drama Series. In 1998 and 1999 he received ALMA awards for Outstanding Actor in a Drama Series from American Latino Media Arts for this role on Law & Order. 

In 1999, Bratt decided to leave Law & Order. "I've felt like it was time to get back home to my family," Bratt said. "How do you walk away from the best job in the world and a group of people that you've grown to love? It's not easy, and it was an extremely difficult decision that I had to make." On May 26, 1999, Bratt's final episode was aired. In 2009, Bratt returned as the now-retired Curtis on Law & Order, where he was reunited with his former boss, Lt. Anita Van Buren (S. Epatha Merkerson), in the episode that aired on December 11, 2009. He returned to his film career that same year.

Later work 
In 2000, Bratt co-starred with Madonna and Rupert Everett in The Next Best Thing. That same year, he played opposite Sandra Bullock in the romantic comedy Miss Congeniality and had a small role in the ensemble work Traffic, which included Benicio del Toro, Michael Douglas, Don Cheadle and Catherine Zeta-Jones. In 2004, the actor co-starred in Catwoman with Halle Berry and Sharon Stone. Bratt often portrays Hispanic characters, especially in his later work. Bratt said, "I've played 'Latin-looking spiv, third from the right so many times I can't count." In 2001, he starred in the biopic film Piñero, for which he received an ALMA Award for Outstanding Actor. He played Puerto Rican actor and poet Miguel Piñero.

He produced the 2009 film La Mission, directed by his brother, Peter Bratt. Peter Bratt also directed Follow Me Home, which Bratt produced and starred in. 

In 2017, Bratt served as a Consulting Producer for the documentary film Dolores, directed by Peter Bratt; they supported the American Indian Movement. The film received critical acclaim and many awards. In 2009, Bratt performed in The People Speak, a documentary feature film that uses dramatic and musical performances of the letters, diaries, and speeches of everyday Americans, based on historian Howard Zinn's A People's History of the United States. Bratt was passionate about his opportunity to play a Tlicho Indian in the film The Lesser Blessed, which he valued because of his own Native background.

Bratt has appeared in several television shows since 2000, including starring as Jahil Rivera on Star and William Banks in The Cleaner. He  played Dr. Jake Reilly in 36 episodes of Private Practice. He also appeared in such notable series as Frasier, 24: Live Another Day and E-Ring. Bratt appeared in Exiled: A Law & Order Movie and Homicide: Life on the Street as Rey Curtis, his role in Law & Order. His later popular films include The Woodsman, Snitch, Trucker, Thumbsucker, The Great Raid, Ride Along 2, and The Infiltrator.

Bratt has featured in five animated feature films, which include El Macho, the main antagonist, in Despicable Me 2. He played Manny the cameraman in Cloudy with a Chance of Meatballs and reprised his role in Cloudy with a Chance of Meatballs 2. Also, in 2015, he voiced Superman in Justice League: Gods and Monsters. In the 2017 film Coco, Bratt voiced Ernesto de la Cruz, the main antagonist who was a Mexican folk legend and main character Miguel's idol. Bratt sings "Remember Me", a popular song in the film that is sung by many other characters throughout. "Remember Me" won Best Original Song at the 2018 Academy Awards; Coco won Best Animated Feature.

In 2016, Bratt played Jonathan Pangborn, a former paraplegic who uses magic to regain the full use of his body, in Doctor Strange. Bratt starred opposite Nicolas Cage in the 2019 action-thriller film A Score to Settle, directed by Shawn Ku.

In 2023, he had a recurring role in the Peacock series Poker Face.

Activism and philanthropy 

He has been active in the American Indian Movement and supports such causes as the American Indian College Fund. 

He narrated We Shall Remain (2009), a PBS mini-series about Native Americans, and part of its American Experience. 

Bratt has for years supported and served as a board member of the San Francisco Bay Area's Friendship House Association of American Indians and the Native American Health Center. Bratt also has supported area organizations such as the Tribal Athletics Program, and United Indian Nations.

In 2002, he and Priscilla López received the Rita Moreno HOLA Award for Excellence from the Hispanic Organization of Latin Actors (HOLA).

Personal life
In 1998, Bratt began dating actress Julia Roberts. In 2001, they announced they were no longer a couple.

In 2002, he began dating actress and former Bond girl Talisa Soto; they married on April 13 in San Francisco. The two had met ten years earlier during a casting audition. During the filming of Piñero (2001) they began to develop a relationship. Their first child, daughter Sophia Rosalinda Bratt, was born on December 6, 2002; their second child, son Mateo Bravery Bratt, was born on October 3, 2005.

His brother, Peter Bratt, wrote and directed the film Follow Me Home (1996), featuring Benjamin as Abel. 

Additionally, Peter wrote and directed the independent film La Mission (2009), starring Benjamin as Che Rivera, an inhabitant of the Mission District.

Filmography

Film

Television

Awards and nominations

References

External links

 
 

1963 births
Living people
20th-century American male actors
21st-century American male actors
American Conservatory Theater alumni
American male film actors
American male television actors
American male voice actors
American people of English descent
American people of German descent
American people of Peruvian descent
American people of Quechua descent
Hispanic and Latino American male actors
Lowell High School (San Francisco) alumni
Male actors from San Francisco
Mission District, San Francisco
Outstanding Performance by a Cast in a Motion Picture Screen Actors Guild Award winners
University of California, Santa Barbara alumni